The 1983 NCAA Division I baseball season, play of college baseball in the United States organized by the National Collegiate Athletic Association (NCAA) began in the spring of 1983.  The season progressed through the regular season and concluded with the 1983 College World Series.  The College World Series, held for the thirty seventh time in 1983, consisted of one team from each of eight regional competitions and was held in Omaha, Nebraska at Johnny Rosenblatt Stadium as a double-elimination tournament.  Texas claimed the championship for the fourth time.

Realignment and format changes
Nicholls State and Samford joined the Trans America Athletic Conference after transitioning to NCAA Division I, while Northeast Louisiana departed for the Southland Conference.  The league dissolved its two divisions.
Chattanooga discontinued its baseball program after the 1982 season.

Conference winners
This is a partial list of conference champions from the 1983 season.  The NCAA sponsored regional competitions to determine the College World Series participants.  Six regionals of four teams and two of six each competed in double-elimination tournaments, with the winners advancing to Omaha.  24 teams earned automatic bids by winning their conference championship while 12 teams earned at-large selections.

Conference standings
The following is an incomplete list of conference standings:

College World Series

The 1983 season marked the thirty seventh NCAA Baseball Tournament, which culminated with the eight team College World Series.  The College World Series was held in Omaha, Nebraska.  The eight teams played a double-elimination format, with Texas claiming their fourth championship with a 4–3 win over Alabama in the final.

Award winners

All-America team

References

Notes